Red Roman may refer to
Solifugae, an order of Arachnida, also known as camel spiders, wind scorpions or sun spiders                                                                          
Chrysoblephus laticeps, a Southern African marine fish